The Stronger is an 1889 Swedish play by August Strindberg.

The play consists of only one scene. The characters are two women: a "Mrs. X", who speaks, and a "Miss. Y", who is silent, an example of a dramatic monologue.

It was adapted into a 1952 opera by composer Hugo Weisgall and there have been numerous film and television adaptations of the work.

It has also been expanded and adapted into a forty-minute English-language zarzuela with a Madrid setting by Derek Barnes (2010), with text by Christopher Webber.

References

1889 plays
Plays by August Strindberg
Swedish plays
Two-handers
Plays adapted into operas